Pradeep Machiraju (born 24 October 1983) is an Indian television presenter and actor who works in Telugu films and television. He is known for hosting shows such as Gadasari Atta Sogasari Kodalu and Konchem Touch Lo Unte Chepta. Machiraju won Nandi Award for Best Anchor in 2014. He made his debut as a lead actor with 30 Rojullo Preminchadam Ela (2021).

Early life 
Pradeep was born in Amalapuram, East Godavari district of Andhra Pradesh and brought up in Hyderabad. He did his bachelor's degree in Electrical and Electronics Engineering from Vignan Institute of Technology and Science. He started his career as Radio Jockey at Radio Mirchi.

Filmography

Television
Big Celebrity Challenge (Season 1 & 2) on Zee Telugu
Gadasari Atha Sogasari Kodalu on Zee Telugu
Adhurs on ETV
Nartanasala on ETV
 Konchem Touch Lo Unte Chepta (Season 1–4) on Zee Telugu
 Express Raja on ETV Plus
 Dhee (Season 9–14) on ETV
Pelli Choopulu on Star Maa
 Kick on ETV Plus
 Super Serial Championship (Season 2) on Zee Telugu
 Pradeep Darbar on Zee Telugu
Drama Juniors (Season 1–3&5) on Zee Telugu
Comedy Khiladeelu on Zee Telugu
Local Gangs on Zee Telugu
 Lakshmi Devi Talupu Tadite on Zee Telugu
Sa Re Ga Ma Pa The Next Singing ICON on Zee Telugu
Super Serial Championship (Season 3) on Zee Telugu
Super Queen on Zee Telugu
Ladies and gentlemen on Zee Telugu

References

External links 
 

Living people
Telugu male actors
Telugu television anchors
21st-century Indian male actors
Indian male film actors
1986 births
Indian game show hosts
Male actors in Telugu cinema
Male actors in Telugu television
Male actors from Andhra Pradesh
Nandi Award winners
People from East Godavari district

Indian television talk show hosts